Médina is a commune d'arrondissement of the city of Dakar, Senegal, part of the Dakar-Plateau arrondissement, located in the southern part of Dakar.

Overview
Médina is one of the most ancient and most populous areas of Dakar, and one that has kept its original African character, as opposed to the modern districts of the Plateau. As such, it is also a cultural centre of the city. A number of notable Senegalese people, including the world-famous singer Youssou N'Dour and Omar Pene (another influential singer and musician) were born in Médina.

Médina also houses some of the prominent landmarks of Dakar, including the Grand Mosque and the Soumbédioune market, one of the major street markets of Dakar, which is also a prominent tourist attraction.

History
The commune of Médina was established by the French colonial authorities in 1914. The explicit intent of the establishment of Médina was that of creating a "native quarter" for the African population, clearly separated from the urban areas inhabited by the Europeans, especially for health-related reasons.

References

Arrondissements of Dakar